Água e Vinho is an album by Brazilian pianist and guitarist Egberto Gismonti that was released in 1972. The album contains the songs "Água e Vinho" and "Ano Zero" with lyrics by Geraldo E. Carneiro. These became two of his most popular songs.

Track listing

Personnel
 Egberto Gismonti – guitar, piano, vocals
 Novelli – bass
 João Palma – drums

References

External links
 Gismonti at AllMusic
 Oldies.com

1972 albums
Egberto Gismonti albums